Aklera is a town and a municipality in Jhalawar district  in the state of Rajasthan, India. It has a rock-strewn, scrub-covered terrain, occasionally bright with fields of poppies and citrus-green groves of oranges. Lying in the south-eastern region of Rajasthan at the edge of the Malwa plateau, Aklera area has rocky but water-laden verdant landscape, unlike much of Rajasthan.

History 
The city of Aklera is situated in the south-eastern region of Rajasthan, a region widely known as Hadoti (Hadavati), the land of Hadas. The Hadas are a major branch of the great Chauhan clan of Agnikula Rajputs.

In the 12th century A.D., Hada Rao Deva conquered this territory and founded Bundi state and Hadauti. Later in the early 17th century A. D. during the reign of Mughal emperor Jahangir, the Ruler of Bundi, Rao Ratan Singh gave the smaller principality of Kota to his son, Madho Singh, but when Sahajahan became the emperor, he issued a Farmaan in the name of Madho Singh, recognizing as him the King of Kota.  The domain of the Hadas of Bundi and Kota extended from the hills of Bundi in the west to the Malwa plateau in the east, with a similar expense from north to south.

Geography 

At the border of Rajasthan and Madhya Pradesh, nudging its fat belly into neighboring MP is this fascinating place - Aklera.

The State of Jhalawar was founded on 8 April 1838, out of the Kota territory. Jhalawar state got rise as a result of a treaty between English rulers, Kota state, and Malwa state.

 Nearby Airports (200 miles): Bhopal(BHO, 92.6476 miles), Indore(IDR, 123.35 miles), Gwalior(GWL, 151.108 miles), Jaipur(JAI, 177.505 miles), Khajuraho(HJR, 180.542 miles)
 Nearby Railway Stations Chabra Gugor (45 km), Jhalawar city (53 km), Chachaura-Binaganj (60 km), Byavra-Rajgarh (80 km). Also a new railway line is proposed between Bhopal to Ramganj Mandi via Aklera.
 Aklera has good connectivity by roads. NH 12 Jabalpur-Jaipur Highway passes from Aklera. There are Many RSRTC, MPRTC and Private buses are available from Aklera to the various parts of Rajasthan as like Jhalawar, Kota, Baran, Ajmer, Jaipur, Tonk, Sawai Madhopur, Bundi, Udaipur, Chittorgarh etc And in Madhya Pradesh as like Bhopal, Indore, Ujjain, Byavra-Rajgarh, Khilchipur, Soyat, Guna etc.
Aklera area is an expanse of fertile plain having rich black-cotton soil. It is watered by several rivers, giving it a verdant look: Parvan, Chapi etc.

Climate 
The climate of the area is very much similar to that of the Indo-Gangetic plain, with hot dry summer and delightfully cold winters. The monsoon is, however, quite unlike and very distinct from the oppressive humid climate of the North India plains. Aklera's district (Jhalawar district) is known for the highest rainfall in the Rajasthan state. An average of 35  inches of rainfall keeps it cool, and gentle breezes ward off the stifling humidity.

 Summer   : 49.0 °C (Max), 32.5 °C (Min)
 Winter   : 32.5 °C (Max), 9.5 °C (Min)
 Average Rainfall : 943 mm (Per Year)
 Best Season to travel : September - March

Demographics 
 India census, Aklera had a population of 18,172. Males constitute 52% of the population and females 48%. Aklera has an average literacy rate of 61%, higher than the national average of 59.5%; with 62% of the males and 38% of females literate. 17% of the population is under 6 years of age.

Culture 
On national highway, a big temple called RAM Mandir is situated. Annakut Ceremony celebrated every year in this temple.

Around 16 km from Aklera. The Temple of Lord Hanuman is there, generally Known as Kamkheda Balaji.
People from various states including Madhya Pradesh and Rajasthan gather twice a week on Tuesday and Saturday.

On the banks of Parwan river are ruins of an old township with a huge idol of Lord Ganesh and an 8th-century Shivlinga. This place can be approached from Khanpur by a road running from it to Aklera. Officially Kakuni is in Baran district whereas Bhimgarh is in Jhalawar district.

A place of antiquity streamed with carved pillars, torans and some erotic figures in the ruins of temples scattered over an area of 2 km.  It stands on the bank of river Chhapi where an irrigation dam is under construction.

Situated near the town Khanpur, this 17th-century Jain Temple is known for its architectural splendor and religious value.  It has a 6 feet tall Lord Adinath statue in the sitting position. Accommodation and meals are available in the temple area at a reasonable price 45 km from Aklera.

On the southern fringe of Jhalawar and Rajasthan lies an ancient Jain Temple of Lord Parshwanath. Marble temple is constructed out of the religious endowments by the pious Jain Community of Malwa (M.P.), Maharashtra, Gujarat. An important Jain pilgrimage spot with a 1000-year-old Parshwanath statue. Excellent accommodation and meals at Dharamshala.

Economy
Economy is based on agriculture in area. This area is known for the highest rainfall in the Rajasthan state. This rain is very helpful for the farmers of the region. Besides this satisfying rainfall, district has a lot of irrigation dams, ponds, and medium scale projects, that are serving according to the needs of farmers. 
 
District area of Aklera, Jhalawar is also known for the Production of Citrus (Oranges). The area around Bhawani Mandi has the distinction of being an important place on the International and National Citrus (Naarangi) fruit map. Orange-laden orchards provide a tempting sight. Citrus produced in Jhalawar region are of export-quality, and are exported to various foreign countries. Citrus-belt is spread around the Bhawani Mandi, Jhalawar and Pirawa sub-divisions. 
 
Agricultural Information of Area

Total land area (irrigated) : 60%
Total land area (non-irrigated) : 40%

Major crops of the region 
KHARIF 
Soya Bean :   
Pulses :  
Jowar :  
Maize :

RABI 
Wheat :   
Mustard : 
Grain :  
Coriander :

Education 
For Higher Education :
 Mahatma Gandhi College of Nursing
 Nirogdham School of Nursing
 NJSS Manu Public School
 Tagore ITI
 Tagore T T College
 Tagore Degree College
 Tagore AWTC
 Tagore Public School
 Millennium TT College
 Vijayaraje Mahila TT College
 NJSS Boarding School
 Government Higher Secondary School
 Govt Girls Higher Secondary School
 Adrash Bal Vidya Mandir
 Meera Children Sr. Sec. School
 Tilak public school
 Modern Sr.Sec.School
 The Study International School
 Gurukul Education Academy
 Govt Middle School
 Govt Girls Middle School
 Seedling School
 Royal Secondary School
 Mother Teresa
 New Nalanda Sr. Sec. School
 Nav-Pallavan School
 Gour Education Group
 Bhagwati Secondary School
 L.B.S. School

Military 
Manohar Thana means "beautiful outpost". It is a well-walled town with a strong fort. The fort commands the meeting place of two rivers Parvan and Kaalikhad. The fort has a double fortification outer wall and battlements, inside which runs another circle of walls and battlements. A good dak-bungalow is lately constructed here in the fort with good plantation around. Manohar Thana was a principal seat of Bhil kings who were supplanted by Hada Rajputs of Bundi. This fort in the tribal area of Manohar Thana once occupied an important strategic position.

The oldest rock inscription of the area was found here. The fort and some marvellously built temples are worth a visit.

References 

Cities and towns in Jhalawar district